Oleksandr "Alex" Osadchuk (born 19 February 1972 in Lviv) is an Australian water polo player who competed in the 2004 Summer Olympics.

References

External links
 

1972 births
Living people
Australian male water polo players
Olympic water polo players of Australia
Water polo players at the 2004 Summer Olympics
Ukrainian emigrants to Australia